The Augusta Christian Schools (ACS), is a Christian school located in Martinez, Georgia, in the Augusta, Georgia area in the United States. It includes kindergarten, elementary, and middle and high school.

Accreditation

Augusta Christian Schools is accredited by the Association of Christian Schools International (ACSI) and the Southern Association of Colleges and Schools (SACS).

History

The school was founded in 1958 as a small class. They met for years in South Augusta and moved to the Baston Road campus in 1973. In 2004 the school purchase property on Fury's Ferry Road, which is now used for kindergarten classrooms.

In 2016 the school campus was converted to a fiber optic band campus in order to offer student curriculum on laptops and tablets.  The wi-fi campus affords 90% of the schools curriculum to be digital.

Athletics

 1995-1996 Baseball Class AAA SCISA Champions
 1995-1996 Men's Basketball Class AAA SCISA Champions
 1995-1996 Men's Tennis Class AAA SCISA Champions
 1998-1999 Baseball Class AAA SCISA Champions
 1998-1999 Men's Basketball Class AAA SCISA Champions
 2000-2001 Women's Cross Country Class AAA SCISA Champions
 2001-2002 Men's Tennis Class AAA SCISA Champions
 2002-2003 Men's Tennis Class AAA SCISA Champions
 2003-2004 Women's Cross Country Class AAA SCISA Champions
 2003-2004 Women's Track Class AAA SCISA Champions
 2005-2007 Men's Baseball Class AAA SCISA Champions
 2005 Men's Football Class AAA SCISA Champions
 2005, 2006, 2007, 2008, 2009, 2010 FCC Georgia Regional Cheerleading Champions
 2007, 2009, 2010, 2011 FCC National Cheerleading Champions
 2012 Men's Football Class AAA SCISA Champions

References

External links
 Augusta Christian Schools

Christian schools in Georgia (U.S. state)
Private high schools in Georgia (U.S. state)
Educational institutions established in 1958
High schools in Columbia County, Georgia
Private middle schools in Georgia (U.S. state)
Private elementary schools in Georgia (U.S. state)
1958 establishments in Georgia (U.S. state)